Ewartia is a genus of flowering plants in the family Asteraceae native to New Zealand and Australia. It is named after a 20th-century botanist and plant collector named Alfred James Ewart.

 Species

References

External links
 
 Kew Plantlist
 Systax

Asteraceae genera
Asterales of Australia
Flora of New Zealand
Gnaphalieae